Primeira Igreja Batista em Vila Silvia is a church located in São Paulo, Brazil.

References

Churches in São Paulo